Myrtle Beach State Park is a 312 acre state park located in Myrtle Beach, South Carolina on land donated by Myrtle Beach Farms in 1934. The park was the first South Carolina State Park to open in 1936. It was developed by the Civilian Conservation Corps, a New Deal Program created by President Franklin D. Roosevelt. The program was designed to provide employment during the Great Depression while addressing national needs in conservation and recreation. The CCC was instrumental in the development of many of South Carolina’s state parks. A number of buildings built by the CCC in the 1930s are still in use there.

The park includes one mile of undeveloped beach in Horry County. The park's maritime forest has been declared a Heritage Trust Site. The maritime forest includes live oaks and southern magnolias. Other unique features include sea oats located on the dunes and an expansive sand dunes system along the beach. The Myrtle Beach State Park Nature Center features interactive natural history displays, saltwater aquariums and live animals.  Programs about coastal habitat and native wildlife are offered throughout the year. The park also has two nature trails: the Yaupon Nature Trail and the Sculptured Oak Nature Trail.

Myrtle Beach State park is open from 6 am to 8 pm with extended hours from March to November. A fee is charged for admission to the park. South Carolina Department of Parks, Recreation and Tourism offers annual Passports that can significantly decrease admission fees based upon usage.

Camping

The campground has 140 standard sites with individual water and electrical hookups and an additional 138 sites with full hookup. All sites are convenient to hot showers, restrooms and laundromat facilities. All sites also have complimentary wi-fi access. The main campground is located approximately 300 yards from the beach. The overflow campground is for tents only, does not provide electricity and has central water. The 30-site overflow campground is open Easter weekend through Labor Day.

The Ranger Station (store/registration located at the campground entrance) includes limited grocery items, camping supplies, souvenirs, drinks, snacks, and firewood.

Six cabins, located 200 yards from the beach, are completely furnished, heated, air-conditioned, and supplied with bath and bed linens, basic cooking and eating utensils and TV.

Prices vary throughout the year.

The Pier

The park has a fishing pier that stretches out into the Atlantic Ocean for prime fishing. A South Carolina fishing license is not required to fish from the pier; however, you do have to pay for daily fishing. An annual pass for the calendar year is available. Fishing for sharks is prohibited from the fishing pier.

Surf fishing is allowed; however, it is not allowed on the beach where lifeguards are on duty and a South Carolina saltwater fishing license is required. Typical fish caught include flounder, king mackerel, sheepshead, whiting, spot, spanish mackerel, drum and blues.

The Beach

Horry County lifeguards are stationed on the north section of Myrtle Beach State Park from mid-May through mid-September. Umbrellas and beach chairs are available to rent from the lifeguards. The beach at Myrtle Beach State Park falls within the jurisdiction of Horry County, and therefore abides by Horry County Ordinances and Regulations. Horry County also has ordinances that prohibit pets and bicycles on public beaches from May 1 through Labor Day between the hours of 10 am and 5 pm.

Equestrian Trails

Beach access is available beginning the third Saturday in November and continues through the last day of February for horseback riding. A permit is required for each horse that enters the park. Horses are not allowed in the park overnight. Riders must have current Negative Coggins papers for each horse brought into the park (per SC Code of Laws, Act 13, 1976, Sec 1, Chapter 13, Title 47).

References

External links
 Myrtle Beach State Park Official Site
 Myrtle Beach State Park Nature Center
 More information about Myrtle Beach State Park

Tourist attractions in Myrtle Beach, South Carolina
State parks of South Carolina
Protected areas of Horry County, South Carolina
Nature centers in South Carolina
Civilian Conservation Corps in South Carolina
Education in Horry County, South Carolina